Longicella mollis is a species of moth of the family Noctuidae first described by Francis Walker in 1856.

Subspecies
 Longicella mollis decipiens Butler, 1884
 Longicella mollis detanii Kishida, 1993
 Longicella mollis mollis Walker, 1856

Description
The wings are gray blue, with a greenish tinge, black veins, large black spots and irregular black stripes.

Distribution
This species can be found in the Peninsular Malaysia, in Sumatra and in Borneo.

References

External links
"Longicella mollis". ZipcodeZoo.com. Archived August 25, 2014.

Moths described in 1884
Agaristinae